The Lillestrøm–Vålerenga rivalry  is a football rivalry in Norway between Lillestrøm SK and Vålerenga Fotball. It has been referred to as the biggest derby match in Norway. Vålerenga are located in the east of the capital of Oslo, while Lillestrøm are located just outside of the capital, in Lillestrøm municipality. Both Lillestrøm and Vålerenga are among the most successful clubs in Norwegian football, having won 11 and 9 titles respectively. They have both played over 1,000 matches in the Norwegian top division. The women's sections of the clubs are called LSK Kvinner FK and Vålerenga Fotball Damer.

History
The first top division fixture between the two teams took place in August 1954. It was played at Åråsen Stadion and Vålerenga won it 2–0. The rivalry between the two clubs started in the 1970s, when Lillestrøm became a prominent team in Norwegian football. Tom Lund was one of the club's most important players in these years. Lillestrøm's rise to prominence also saw some of the best players from Vålerenga and other Oslo clubs move to Lillestrøm.

Vålerenga and Lillestrøm have faced each other in the cup final twice, in 1980 and 1985. In 1980, Vålerenga won 4–1. In 1985, Lillestrøm won 4–1.

In October 1999, Mamadou Diallo, who was loaned out from Lillestrøm to Vålerenga, scored two goals as Vålerenga defeated Lillestrøm 3–1. He celebrated one of the goals by running to the Lillestrøm fans and blowing a kiss in their direction. Diallo's explanation of the incident was that he wanted to show his appreciation for the LSK fans after two years at the club.

In June 2013, three days before a match between the two teams, the statue of Tom Lund outside Åråsen Stadion was beheaded. It was not the first time the statue had been vandalised. In December 2002, it was covered in paint, a Vålerenga kit and a Santa hat. Vålerenga fans had previously urinated at the statue ahead of matches between the two clubs.

Men's football

Honours
Honours won by Lillestrøm and Vålerenga.

Head-to-head
The head-to-head statistics shows the results between Lillestrøm and Vålerenga in the Norwegian League and Cup.

List of matches

League

Cup

Played for both clubs

Players who have played for both clubs:

 Eivind Arnevåg
 Petter Belsvik
 Henning Berg
 Thomas Berntsen
 Tommy Berntsen
 Lars Bohinen
 Markus Brændsrød
 Vidar Davidsen
 Mamadou Diallo
 Otto Fredrikson
 Rune Hansen
 Joar Hoff
 Anders Jacobsen
 Henrik Kjelsrud Johansen
 Ronny Johnsen
 Erik Karlsen
 Kent Karlsen
 Patric Karlsson
 Ulrik Mathisen
 Runar Normann
 Kenneth Nysæther
 Terje Olsen
 Ivar Rønningen
 Fredrik Stoor

Eliteserien rankings (1963–2022)
The table lists the clubs' finishing positions in the top division since 1963.

Women's football
HonoursHonours won by LSK and Vålerenga.Head-to-headThe head-to-head statistics shows the results between Lillestrøm and Vålerenga in the Norwegian League and Cup.

List of matches

League

Cup

Notes

References

Football rivalries in Norway
Lillestrøm SK
Vålerenga Fotball